898 Hildegard  is a bright background asteroid, approximately  in diameter, that is located in the central regions of the asteroid belt. The stony S-type asteroid (Sl) has a rotation period of 24.9 hours and a relatively high orbital eccentricity of 0.37. It was probably named after Saint Hildegard of Bingen (1098–1179).

Orbit and classification 

Hildegard is a non-family asteroid of the main belt's background population when applying the hierarchical clustering method to its proper orbital elements. It orbits the Sun in the central asteroid belt at a distance of 1.7–3.7 AU once every 4 years and 6 months (1,648 days; semi-major axis of 2.73 AU). Its orbit has a high eccentricity of 0.37 and an inclination of 10° with respect to the ecliptic. With a perihelion of 1.72 AU, Hildegard is notably close of becoming an outer-grazer to Mars, which has its aphelion at 1.67 AU. The body's observation arc begins at Heidelberg Observatory with its official discovery observation on 3 August 1918.

Naming 

This minor planet was probably named after Saint Hildegard of Bingen (1098–1179). The Benedictine abbess is considered to be the founder of scientific natural history in Germany. The  was also mentioned in The Names of the Minor Planets by Paul Herget in 1955.

Physical characteristics 

In the Bus–Binzel SMASS classification, Hildegard is an Sl-subtype, which transitions from the common stony S-type to the uncommon L-type asteroid.

Rotation period 

In April 2008, a rotational lightcurve of Hildegard was obtained from photometric observations by Australian amateur astronomer David Higgins. Lightcurve analysis gave a well-defined rotation period of  hours with a brightness variation of  magnitude. Previously in June 1999, observations by Brian Warner at his Palmer Divide Observatory  in Colorado only gave a period of above 24 hours and an amplitude larger than 0.3 magnitude. Asteroid's with a rotation period near 24 hours are difficult to observe, since full coverage can not be obtained by a few consecutive nights of observation from a single observatory alone, due to Earth's nearly synchronous rotation. In such cases, international collaborations are highly useful with each observatory covering a different section of the lightcurve.

In 2016, a modeled lightcurve gave a concurring sidereal period of  hours using data from a large collaboration of individual observers (such as above). The study also determined two spin axes of (344.0°, 27.0°) and (164.0°, 8.0°) in ecliptic coordinates (λ, β).

Diameter and albedo 

The Collaborative Asteroid Lightcurve Link assumes a standard albedo for a stony asteroid of 0.20 and calculates a diameter of 13.58 kilometers based on an absolute magnitude of 11.7.

Notes

References

External links 
 Lightcurve Database Query (LCDB), at www.minorplanet.info
 Dictionary of Minor Planet Names, Google books
 Discovery Circumstances: Numbered Minor Planets (1)-(5000) – Minor Planet Center
 
 

000898
Discoveries by Max Wolf
Named minor planets
898 Hildegard
000898
19180803